Didierea is a genus of succulent flowering plants in the family Didiereaceae. It is dedicated to naturalist Alfred Grandidier (1836-1921).

Species of Didierea are dioecious, with male and female flowers on separate plants. The two known species are endemic to Madagascar, where they are found in the spiny forest–thicket ecosystem. They are listed in CITES appendix II, which means that their trade is restricted to protect natural populations.

Species

References

Didiereaceae
Endemic flora of Madagascar
Caryophyllales genera
Taxa named by Henri Ernest Baillon
Dioecious plants
Flora of the Madagascar spiny thickets